Haima  is an airport serving the town of Haima in Oman.

The Haima VOR/DME (Ident: HAI) is located on the field.

See also
List of airports in Oman
Transport in Oman

References

External links
 OpenStreetMap - Haima Airport
 OurAirports - Haima Airport
 
 FallingRain - Haima

Airports in Oman